Gulistan-e-Johar or Gulistan-e-Jauhar is a neighborhood in the Karachi East district of Karachi, Pakistan.

Administration 
It was previously administered as part of the Gulshan Subdivision borough, which was disbanded in 2011. Some blocks of the neighborhood fall into Faisal Cantonment Board's administration.

See also 
 Gulshan-e-Iqbal
 Gulzar-e-Hijri

References

External links
Karachi City Government

Neighbourhoods of Karachi
Gulshan Town